Frederick Charles Hicks  (January 1, 1863 in St. Clair County, Michigan– September 7, 1953) became President of the University of Cincinnati on in 1904.  During his term as president a number of buildings were constructed, including Beecher Hall (1916), Nippert Stadium, Old Chemistry (1917) and Swift Hall (1925) among others.

References

 

1863 births
1953 deaths
Presidents of the University of Cincinnati